Sequel to the Prequel is the third studio album by the English band Babyshambles. It was released on 3 September 2013 under EMI Records. It is their first release of new material since 2007's Shotter's Nation.

Background
Originally planned to be Pete Doherty's second solo record, the album soon became a Babyshambles record, with all tracks being co-written by guitarist Mick Whitnall or bassist Drew McConnell, a first for the band. Recording began in January 2013 and included contributions from Stereophonics drummer Jaime Morrison, as the band's previous drummer, Danny Goffey had left in 2012. Production was handled by Stephen Street, who produced Babyshambles' previous studio album, Shotter's Nation, and Pete Doherty's 2009 solo effort, Grace/Wastelands.

Track listing

Chart performance

References

2013 albums
Babyshambles albums
EMI Records albums
Albums produced by Stephen Street